Athrips phaeomicta is a moth of the family Gelechiidae. It is found in the Democratic Republic of Congo (Equateur).

The wingspan is 8–10 mm. The forewings are whitish-ochreous, more or less irregularly and rather suffusedly mixed grey. The hindwings are whitish-ochreous.

References

Moths described in 1936
Athrips
Moths of Africa